Entraunes is a commune in the Alpes-Maritimes department in southeastern France.

Location
Entraunes lies 110 km northwest of Nice where the Var flows into the Mediterranean. It lies in the northwest corner of Alpes-Maritimes next to the department of Alpes-de-Haute-Provence. Since 1979, it has been part of the Parc National du Mercantour.

Geography
The Var has its source in the commune at an elevation of 1790 m at the foot of the Estenc Glacier.

The western limit of the commune is the line of peaks that separated the territory of the House of Savoie from France on the west.

Climate
The climate is high-elevation Mediterranean. Annual snowfall averages 1.80 m with 20 days of snowfall annually. Rainfall averages 1384 mm, with heavy rains in the fall and drought in the summer. Up to 1600 m, the terrain is forested, and above that, are alpine meadows up to the rocky peaks.

Population

See also
Communes of the Alpes-Maritimes department

References

Communes of Alpes-Maritimes
Alpes-Maritimes communes articles needing translation from French Wikipedia